SK Group (Korean: SK그룹, 에스케이그룹) is the second largest South Korean chaebol behind Samsung Group. SK Group is composed of 186 subsidiaries and affiliates that share the SK brand name and the group's management culture, named SKMS (SK Management System). It changed its name from Sunkyong Group (Korean: 선경그룹, Hanja: 鮮京그룹) to SK Group in 1998. The group is controlled by estate of Chey Tae-won through a holding company, SK Inc. The cornerstone of SK Group is its energy and chemicals division.

While its largest businesses are primarily involved in the energy, petroleum, and chemical industries, the group also owns the nation's largest wireless mobile phone service provider SK Telecom, and provides services in  construction, marketing, local telephone, high-speed Internet, and wireless broadband (WiBro), and is also the owner of SK Hynix, the world's fourth largest chipmaker.

History

Formation and early production
As with many other chaebols, SK Group's chairmanship was 'inherited' from father to son: from its founder the late Chey Jong-hyon to its present chairman Chey Tae-won (eldest son). Chey Tae-won is married to the daughter of the former South Korean President Roh Tae-woo.

SK Group began when the current founders acquired Sunkyong Textiles (founded during the Japanese rule as a joint venture between two Japanese companies, Senman Chutan and Kyoto-based Kyoto Orimono Company) from South Korean government as abandoned property of Japan in 1953. In 1958, the company manufactured Korea's first polyester fiber on company grounds. It established Sunkyong Fibers Ltd. in July 1969, and started to produce original yarn. In 1973, SK then established Sunkyong Oil, beginning a vertical integration strategy to manage production, "From Petroleum to Fibers". That same year, the company acquired the Walkerhill Hotel.

In 1976, Sunkyong Corporation received an international trading company license from the Indian government. In December 1980 SK purchased privately run Korea National Oil, making it Korea's fifth largest conglomerate.

In January 1988, crude oil was imported for processing to Korea from Yemen's Marib oil field.

Growing up years
In June 1994, SK entered Korea's telecommunications business by becoming Korea Mobile Telecommunication Service's largest shareholder. In January 1996, SK Telecom launched Korea's first commercial CDMA cellular phone service in Incheon and Bucheon.

In 1998, Management re-branded Sunkyong to SK. In 1999, SK Chemicals developed third-generation (non cross resistant) platinum-complex anti-cancer agent. Also, by focusing its research and development efforts on life sciences, SK Corporation developed YKP1358, a new drug candidate for schizophrenia, in 2003.

In 2002, SK Telecom successfully launched the world's first commercial CDMA 1X EV-DO technology, allowing it to offer 3G telecommunications service. In 2004, SK Telecom enabled satellite DMB service by deploying the world's first DMB satellite. Moreover, in 2006, SK began revitalizing the 3.5-generation mobile phone market and in the following year, completed the construction of the national HSDPA network. In May 2006, SK Telecom started the world's first commercial 3.5-generation HSDPA service, featuring high-quality video telephony and data transmission, and global roaming access.

In 2005, SK Networks opened China's first two wholly foreign-owned, gas stations in Shenyang. Then, after exploring Brazilian mining area BM-C-8, SK Corporation developed an oil field where it confirmed the existence of more than 50 million barrels of oil deposits.

SK Gas began developing resources overseas when it participated in two mining areas to the west of Russia's Kamchatka peninsula in March 2006. In early 2006, SK Networks also developed Ecol-Green, a biodegradable plastic material. Incheon Oil officially started operations using the SK name in March 2006. SK Energy is currently engaged in 27 oil fields in 15 countries worldwide

SKC imported propylene oxide (PO, a chemical used in manufacturing polyurethane) production technology from Germany in May 2006. It is scheduled to produce 100,000 tons of PO from 2008.

At the end of 2005, SK Corp. developed a lithium ion battery separator (LiBS) for the first time in Korea, and started selling the product in 2006. In July 2007, SK Group adopted a holding company structure.
Under the re-organization, SK's main entity, SK Corporation, was split into an investment company, now SK Inc. and an operating company, now SK Energy. The subsidiary companies that now operate under the central SK Inc. umbrella include: SK Energy, SK Telecom, SK Networks, SKC, SK E&S, SK Shipping and K Power.

Recent years
In February 2017, SK acquired the polyethylene acrylic acid business of Dow Chemical Company for $370 million, and planned to increase battery production capacity from 1.9 to 3.9 GWh per year at the end of 2018, supplying Kia and Mercedes.

In July 2022, SK Group announced a $22 billion investment in the United States semiconductor, green energy bioscience and other technology industries. In total, SK Group will invest over $30 billion in the United States by 2025.

Subsidiaries

Holdings 
 SK Inc. is a holding company which resulted when SK Corporation was reorganized on July 1, 2007, into a holding company and operating company, SK Inc. and SK Energy, respectively. SK Inc. is a part of the SK Group that focuses on 4 core business interests, High-tech materials, Bio, Green and Digital. The SK Group is composed of 186 affiliate companies that share the SK brand and culture. In 2021, SK Group recorded combined revenues of $133 billion, with exports contributing $50 billion of that total. SK continues to expand its global presence, with more than 117,590 employees who work from 473 offices worldwide.

Energy & Chemicals 

SK Innovation is a South Korean enterprise formed as part of the July 1, 2007 reorganization of SK Corporation into a holding company and operating company, SK Inc. and SK Energy, respectively. In 2011, the petroleum business was spun off to become SK Energy. Simultaneously the chemical business was spun off to become SK Innovation. SK Energy was founded in 1962 as Korea's first oil refinery. In 1982, changed company name to Yukong. SK Energy is an energy and petrochemical company with 5,000 employees, KRW 23.65 trillion in sales and 26 offices spanning the globe. The company is Korea's largest (and Asia's fourth largest) refiner with a refining capacity of 1.15 million barrels per day, as of 2006. SK Energy is engaged in exploration and development activities in 26 oil / gas blocks in 14 nations worldwide.
 SKC, headquartered in Seoul, is the leading Korean company in chemical and film industry. SKC was founded and established in 1976 as previous name of Sunkyong Chemicals Ltd (Korean: 선경화학 (주)). SKC developed polyester films firstly in Korea, by its own efforts. With its main plant and R&D center located in Suwon, South Korea, it also operates large capacity of film plant in Georgia, United States.

Information & Communications Technology 

SK Telecom
SK Square is a portfolio management company.
SK Inc. C&C was established in 1991 and is currently one of the "Big Three" IT services companies in Korea. SK C&C has business interests across IT services, including telecommunications, banking & finance, government, public, logistics, and other fields.

Semiconductor & Materials 
SK Hynix is the world's 3rd-largest semiconductor manufacturer and the 2nd-largest in South Korea after Samsung Electronics which is the leader in the global semiconductor industry. SK Hynix was founded in 1983 as "Hyundai Electronics", which is the origin of its name "Hynix", and merged to SK Group in 2012 when SK Telecom became the major shareholder. The major products are DRAM, flash memory, and many other semiconductor materials. While its headquarter is located at Icheon, Gyeonggido, it also runs a large production line at Cheongju, Chungcheongbuk-do.
SK Siltron is the only semiconductor wafer manufacturer in Korea, and it has grown hand in hand with the semiconductor industry over the last 35 plus years. Armed with a record-long history of mass production and accumulated know-how, the company expands its production capacity in a preemptive manner and continues to strengthen its manufacturing and technology competitiveness. At the same time, the company is expanding its business portfolio to include emerging areas such as SiC wafers. This lays a strong foundation for SK Siltron to grow to become one of the world’s best semiconductor materials players both in production volume and profitability.

Logistics, Services & Bio 
SK Biopharmaceuticals is a drug discovery and drug development company.  It discovered solriamfetol.
SK pharmteco is a global contract development and manufacturing organization specializing in the production of active pharmaceutical ingredients (APIs), intermediates and viral vectors for cell and gene therapy for the pharmaceutical industry. SK Pharmteco operates six facilities in Europe, North America and Korea.
SK Ecoplant is a Korean construction company founded and established in 1977 with a previous name of Sunkyong Construction (Korean: 선경 건설), headquartered in Gwanhun-dong Jongno-gu, Seoul. Its brands include SK View, SK Hub, and Apelbaum. The company's CEO is Ki Haeng Cho. Industries: Oil & Gas, Petrochemical, Power, Environmental Protection, Industrial, Civil, Building, Housing. Services:Feasibility Study, EPC Service, Project Management, Operations & Maintenance.

Management system 
SK's subsidiary companies all operate under the SK Management System (SKMS) which was developed, articulated and enhanced by SK's Chairman, Chey Tae-won.

On April 7, 2008, SK Group launched a marketing and management company named "SK Marketing & Company" to pursue Chairman Chey's vision.

See also 

 Chaebol
 Economy of South Korea
 H.A.V.E. Online
 Fallen Age

References

 
Chaebol
Companies listed on the Korea Exchange
Conglomerate companies established in 1953
Conglomerate companies of South Korea
Electric vehicle battery manufacturers
Manufacturing companies based in Seoul
Multinational companies headquartered in South Korea
Non-renewable resource companies established in 1953
Oil companies of South Korea
Petrochemical companies
South Korean brands
Technology companies of South Korea
South Korean companies established in 1953
Manufacturing companies established in 1953